The Dantokpa Market, or simply Tokpa, is the largest open-air market in West Africa, located in Cotonou, Benin.It is one of the most important retailing areas in Benin, covering over 20 hectares. It is also economically important for the country, with a reported commercial turnover of over a billion CFA Francs a day. 

The market is featured in Netflix's "High on the Hog", Stephen Satterfield's documentary about African-American cuisine.

See also
Markets in Benin

References

Cotonou
Retail markets in Benin